Barbara Mills Larkin (born July 26, 1951 in Dubuque, Iowa) was United States Assistant Secretary of State for Legislative Affairs from 1996 to 2001.

Biography

Larkin enrolled in Clarke College in 1969 and received a B.A. in 1973.  She then attended the University of Iowa College of Law, earning a J.D. in 1977.  During her time in law school, Larkin spent 1974-75 as legislative aide of Rep. Mike Blouin (D—IA-2).

After law school, Larkin joined the Raleigh, North Carolina, law firm of Sanford, Adams, McCullough, and Beard.  In 1986, she became chief counsel and foreign policy adviser of Sen. Terry Sanford (D—NC).  Sanford was a member of the United States Senate Committee on Foreign Relations, and Larkin also worked on the professional staff of the United States Senate Foreign Relations Subcommittee on Near Eastern and South and Central Asian Affairs.  She became legislative director and counsel to Sen. Dianne Feinstein (D—CA).

A year later, Larkin moved to the United States Department of State, becoming Deputy Assistant Secretary of State for Legislative Affairs (Senate).  On April 17, 1996, President of the United States Bill Clinton nominated Larkin as Assistant Secretary of State for Legislative Affairs and, after Senate confirmation, Larkin subsequently held this office from July 19, 1996, until January 19, 2001.

In February 2004, Larkin became Vice President (Policy and Advocacy) of CARE, a position she held until September 2008.  In March 2010, she became a Senior Advisor to  the Administrator of the United States Agency for International Development.

References

External links 
Press Release Announcing Clinton's Nomination of Larkin as Assistant Secretary of State for Legislative Affairs

1951 births
Living people
United States Assistant Secretaries of State
Clinton administration personnel
People from Dubuque, Iowa
Clarke University alumni
University of Iowa College of Law alumni
North Carolina lawyers